Zhang Chongyao (born 26 November 1985) is a Chinese wrestler. He competed for China at the 2012 Summer Olympics in the men's middleweight (-74 kg) freestyle wrestling competition.

See also
China at the 2012 Summer Olympics

References

External links
 

Chinese male sport wrestlers
Wrestlers at the 2012 Summer Olympics
Olympic wrestlers of China
1985 births
Living people
Sportspeople from Beijing
Wrestlers at the 2010 Asian Games
Wrestlers at the 2014 Asian Games
Asian Games competitors for China
21st-century Chinese people